Ivan Herceg (born 2 November 1981) is a Croatian actor.

Filmography

Television roles

Movie roles

External links

Notes

1981 births
Living people
21st-century Croatian male actors
Croatian male stage actors
Croatian male film actors
Croatian male television actors
Male actors from Zagreb